Wetaskiwin was a provincial electoral district in Alberta, Canada, mandated to return a single member to the Legislative Assembly of Alberta from 1905 to 1971.

History
The Wetaskiwin electoral district was one of the original 25 electoral districts contested in the 1905 Alberta general election upon Alberta joining Confederation in September 1905. The district was carried over from the old Wetaskiwin electoral district which returned a single member to the Legislative Assembly of the Northwest Territories from 1898 to 1905.

Liberal candidate Anthony Rosenroll who was the incumbent in the previous Northwest Territories' Legislature since 1891 was the first member elected for the Wetaskiwin electoral district.

Members of the Legislative Assembly (MLAs)

Election results

1905 general election

The Returning Officer for the 1905 election was James Kennedy Burgess

1909 general election
Liberal Charles H. Olin defeated Conservative James George Anderson in the 1909 election. Anderson previously contested the 1908 Canadian federal election in the Strathcona district as an Independent.

1913 general election

1914 by-election

1917 general election

1921 general election

1926 general election

1930 general election

1935 general election

1940 general election

1944 general election

1948 general election

1952 general election

1955 general election

1959 general election

1963 general election

1967 general election

Plebiscite results

1957 liquor plebiscite

On October 30, 1957 a stand alone plebiscite was held province wide in all 50 of the then current provincial electoral districts in Alberta. The government decided to consult Alberta voters to decide on liquor sales and mixed drinking after a divisive debate in the Legislature. The plebiscite was intended to deal with the growing demand for reforming antiquated liquor control laws.

The plebiscite was conducted in two parts. Question A asked in all districts, asked the voters if the sale of liquor should be expanded in Alberta, while Question B asked in a handful of districts within the corporate limits of Calgary and Edmonton asked if men and woman were allowed to drink together in establishments.

Province wide Question A of the plebiscite passed in 33 of the 50 districts while Question B passed in all five districts. Wetaskiwin was the only other city in Alberta aside from Lethbridge to vote against the proposal. The vote was nearly even with the No side winning by a slim margin. The voter turnout in the district was slightly above the province wide average of 46%.

Official district returns were released to the public on December 31, 1957. The Social Credit government in power at the time did not considered the results binding. However the results of the vote led the government to repeal all existing liquor legislation and introduce an entirely new Liquor Act.

Municipal districts lying inside electoral districts that voted against the Plebiscite such as Wetaskiwin were designated Local Option Zones by the Alberta Liquor Control Board and considered effective dry zones, business owners that wanted a license had to petition for a binding municipal plebiscite in order to be granted a license.

See also
List of Alberta provincial electoral districts
Wetaskiwin, a city in Alberta, Canada
Wetaskiwin (electoral district), a federal electoral district from 1925 to 2015
Wetaskiwin (N.W.T. electoral district), a territorial electoral district from 1898 to 1905

References

Further reading

External links
Elections Alberta
The Legislative Assembly of Alberta

Former provincial electoral districts of Alberta